The Museum of Northwest Art (also referred to as MoNA) is an art museum located in La Conner, Washington, and is focused on the Northwest School art movement, which had its peak in the mid-20th century. The Museum was founded by Art Hupy in 1981. It moved to its present building in 1995.

References

External links 
 Museum of Northwest Art website

Art museums and galleries in Washington (state)
Museums of American art
Museums in Skagit County, Washington
Art museums established in 1981
Museum of Northwest Art